Irina Zaretska (born 4 March 1996) is a Ukrainian (until 2014) and Azerbaijani (since 2015) karateka. She won the silver medal in the women's +61kg event at the 2020 Summer Olympics held in Tokyo, Japan. She is a two-time gold medalist in the women's 68kg event at the World Karate Championships (2018 and 2021) and the Islamic Solidarity Games (2017 and 2022). She also won the gold medal in this event at the 2015 European Games and the 2021 European Karate Championships.

Career

She won one of the bronze medals in the women's kumite 68kg event at the 2014 World Karate Championships held in Bremen, Germany.

At the 2017 Islamic Solidarity Games held in Baku, Azerbaijan, she won the gold medal in the women's kumite 68kg event.

At the 2018 European Karate Championships held in Novi Sad, Serbia, she won the silver medal in the women's kumite 68kg event. In the final, she lost against Elena Quirici of Switzerland. She also became world champion in the women's kumite 68kg event at the 2018 World Karate Championships held in Madrid, Spain.

In 2019, she won the silver medal in the women's kumite 68kg event at the European Games held in Minsk, Belarus. Four years earlier, she won the gold medal in this event at the 2015 European Games held in Baku, Azerbaijan.

She represented Azerbaijan in karate at the 2020 Summer Olympics in Tokyo, Japan. She won the silver medal in the women's +61kg event. In November 2021, she won the gold medal in the women's 68kg event at the World Karate Championships held in Dubai, United Arab Emirates.

She competed in the women's kumite 68kg event at the 2022 European Karate Championships held in Gaziantep, Turkey. She also competed in the women's team kumite event. She lost her bronze medal match in the women's 68kg event at the 2022 World Games held in Birmingham, United States. She won the gold medal in the women's 68kg event at the 2021 Islamic Solidarity Games held in Konya, Turkey.

Achievements

References

External links 

 
 

1996 births
Living people
Sportspeople from Odesa
Azerbaijani female karateka
Ukrainian female karateka
Karateka at the 2015 European Games
Karateka at the 2019 European Games
European Games medalists in karate
European Games gold medalists for Azerbaijan
European Games silver medalists for Azerbaijan
Ukrainian emigrants to Azerbaijan
Naturalized citizens of Azerbaijan
Islamic Solidarity Games medalists in karate
Islamic Solidarity Games competitors for Azerbaijan
Karateka at the 2020 Summer Olympics
Olympic karateka of Azerbaijan
Medalists at the 2020 Summer Olympics
Olympic medalists in karate
Olympic silver medalists for Azerbaijan
Competitors at the 2022 World Games
21st-century Ukrainian women
21st-century Azerbaijani women